Anomocentris is a genus of moths in the family Geometridae.

Species
 Anomocentris capnoxutha Turner, 1939
 Anomocentris cosmadelpha (Lower, 1901)
 Anomocentris crystallota Meyrick, 1891
 Anomocentris trissodesma (Lower, 1897)

References
 Anomocentris at Markku Savela's Lepidoptera and Some Other Life Forms

Hydriomenini
Geometridae genera